Shandong is a Chinese restaurant in Portland, Oregon.

Description
Shandong is a popular Chinese restaurant in northeast Portland's Hollywood neighborhood, named after China's Shandong province. Portland Monthly says, "Sporting sleek and modern decor, this Chinese spot serves up fresh, house-made eats from the Shandong province and offers a daily 4–6 happy hour." The Chinese menu includes beef, dumplings (including a shrimp variety with ginger and green onion), fried rice, Kung Pao chicken, mu shu chicken (chicken with cabbage, egg, and willow tree mushrooms) served with hand-rolled pancakes, noodles, potstickers, and tan tan. Judy's Noodles is a noodle dish with spinach, scallion greens, garlic, and jalapeño.

History
Shandong is owned by chef Henry Liu.

In 2015, Liu and business partner Vo Chien opened Shandong's Sichuan-focused sister restaurant Kung Pow! in northwest Portland, offering a spicier version of Shandong's menu.

Shandong operated via takeout and delivery at times in 2020, during the COVID-19 pandemic.

Reception

In his 2011 review of the restaurant, Portland Mercury Tony Perez complimented the mu shu chicken, noodles, and shrimp dumplings, but was disappointed by the bean sauce and spicy peanut sauce. He summarized, "Shandong is a step up in some ways—it's not the all-too-familiar gut-bomb experience of some of its greasier MSG-laden brethren, and the high points demonstrate some clear skill in the kitchen—but it's not joining the upper echelon either. If you're craving some Chinese staples, by all means, go... just manage your expectations better than I did." In her 2014 book Food Lovers' Guide to Portland, Oregon: The Best Restaurants, Markets & Local Culinary Offerings, Laurie Wolf wrote: 

In 2015, Eater Portland Danielle Centoni called Shandong "one of Northeast Portland's most popular Chinese restaurants". The website's Nathan Williams included the restaurant in a 2022 list of "14 Standout Spots in Portland’s Eclectic Hollywood District". 

In 2016, Willamette Week Matthew Korfhage said Shandong serves a "subdued, better-than-most ode to its titular province". Clarissa Wei included Shandong in CNN's 2017 list of the fifty best Chinese restaurants in the U.S., writing: 

Willamette Week included Judy's Noodles in a 2018 list of "Our Favorite Noodle Bowls and Plates in Portland for Less than $15". The newspaper said, "Among the many chopstick-thick, fresh-made noodles at Northeast Broadway's Shandong, the best by far are the simplest."

See also

 List of Chinese restaurants

References

External links

 
 Shandong Restaurant at Zomato

Chinese restaurants in Portland, Oregon
Hollywood, Portland, Oregon